Scaevola humifusa (common name - procumbent scaevola) is a prostrate shrub in the family Goodeniaceae, native to Western Australia. It grows to a height of 0.01 to 0.5 m, and its white-cream/white-blue flowers may be seen from August to November or January.

Description 
Scaevola humifusa is a shrub which sprawls along the ground, and is densely covered in short, weak, soft hairs. Its stems are up to 40 cm long. The thick leaves have no stalks, have smooth edges, and the leaf blades are 5–20 mm long by 1–4 mm wide. The hairs in the axils are woolly and conspicuous. The flowers occur in axillary racemes which are up to 10 mm long. The sepals are almost free and about  0.5 mm long. The corolla which is 7 to 11 mm long is hairy on the outside, and densely hairy in the throat. The flowers are white or cream with greenish or brownish lines. The fruit is obovoid, 2–4 mm long, sometimes ribbed, almost without any covering of hairs or scales and is 1-seeded.

Distribution and habitat
It is found in the IBRA Regions of the Avon Wheatbelt, Coolgardie biogeographic region, the Esperance Plains, the Geraldton Sandplains, the Mallee biogeographic region, and the Swan Coastal Plain, growing on sandy and clayey soils, on saline flats, in open heath and mallee.

Taxonomy and etymology
It was first described and named by Willem Hendrik de Vriese in 1810, and its specific epithet, humifusa, is a botanical Latin adjective derived from the Latin, humus (meaning "ground") and fusus  (meaning "fell down"), thereby giving an adjective which describes the plant as "spreading over the ground", or "lying on the ground".

References

humifusa
Eudicots of Western Australia
Asterales of Australia
Plants described in 1845
Taxa named by Willem Hendrik de Vriese